= Francesca Sanna Sulis =

Italian businessperson (1716-1810)

Francesca Sanna Sulis (1716-1810), was an Italian businessperson.

She was the inventor of the traditional women's silk cap known as cambusciu. Catherine the Great was among her customers.

She founded the charitable institution in Quartucciu on Sardinia.

The public library in Quartucciu, as well as the Museum of women entrepreneurs (MIF) in Muravera has been named after her.
